The University of Córdoba (Spanish: Universidad  de Córdoba, UCO), is a university in Córdoba, in Andalusia, Spain, chartered in 1972. It offers undergraduate and postgraduate studies in humanities, social sciences, health sciences, natural sciences and engineering.

History 

Although it was established in 1972, UCO is the inheritor of the Free University of Córdoba (Universidad Libre de Córdoba), which operated in the province in the late 19th century. Centenary institutions like the Faculty of Veterinary Science depend on UCO.

UCO stands out for its specialization in natural sciences, offering degrees in chemistry, biology, environmental sciences and agronomic and forest engineering. It is also specialized in health sciences, offering degrees in nursing and medicine, closely linked to the Reina Sofía University Hospital, and in humanities (history, art history, teacher training, philosophy, and diverse liberal arts degrees).

The university is structured in three main campuses: the Humanities and Legal and Social Sciences Campus, integrated in the urban centre; the Health Sciences Campus, in the west of the city; and the Agrifood, Science and Technology campus of Rabanales, in the east of the city. UCO also contains the Polytechnic School of Bélmez, situated seventy kilometres away from Córdoba, where Mining Engineering and Public Works Technical Engineering degrees are offered.

Campuses and structure 

The university has four campuses, three in the city of Córdoba and one in Bélmez.

Rabanales Campus 
Faculty of Veterinary Science
Higher Technical School of Agricultural and Forest Engineering 
Faculty of Sciences
Higher Polytechnic School

Menéndez Pidal Campus 
Faculty of Medicine 
School of Nursing

City Centre Campus 
Faculty of Law and Business and Economic Sciences
Faculty of Labour Science
Faculty of Philosophy and Letters
Faculty of Education Sciences

Bélmez Campus 
Higher Polytechnic School of Bélmez

Research centres 

European Documentation Centre
Andalusian Experimental Centre of Animal Health
Veterinary Clinic Hospital
Spanish Network of Aerobiology
Reina Sofía University Hospital
Royal Botanic Garden of Córdoba
Andalusian Inter-University Institute of Criminology
Andalusian Centre of Apiculture

References

 
Córdoba, Spain
Universities and colleges in Spain
Universities in Andalusia